Allan Crawford Kendall (29 September 1928 — 17 December 2013) was an Australian broadcaster and tennis player.

Kendall, born in the New South Wales town of Orange, was a nephew of tennis player Jack Crawford. His father, Victor, ended up running a tennis club in Albury where the then Margaret Smith (Court) trained.

Attending Scots College in Sydney from 1943, Kendall was the 1946 NSW schoolboys singles champion. He was a junior doubles champion at the Australian Championships with Rex Hartwig in 1947.

Kendall received blues in lawn tennis, squash and table tennis while studying at the University of Sydney.

During the 1950s and 1960s he competed on the international tennis tour.

Kendall, who got involved in the arts during university, founded the Australian version of BBC children's television show Play School. He got the idea after a visit to BBC studios in 1964 and retired from tennis to begin working for the ABC. When the show premiered on the ABC in 1966 he was the inaugural producer.

References

External links
 
 

1928 births
2013 deaths
Australian male tennis players
Australian television producers
Australian Broadcasting Corporation people
Tennis people from New South Wales
People from Orange, New South Wales
People educated at Scots College (Sydney)
University of Sydney alumni
Australian Championships (tennis) junior champions
Grand Slam (tennis) champions in boys' doubles